is a Japanese manga series created by Masashi Tanaka, about the (wordless) adventures of a dinosaur and the title character.

Gon was most notable outside Japan for his appearance in the PlayStation version of Tekken 3. An animated TV series began airing in Japan on April 2, 2012. The manga received an Excellence Prize at the Japan Media Arts Festival and won an Eisner Award.

Characteristics 
Gon is a carnivorous species of Carnosaurian but He vaguely looks more like a tyrannosaurid than a carnosaur, due to his T rex like-head. although He is an omnivore with an enormous appetite Gon preyed on hadrosaurs, pterosaurs and ceratopsians, he also hunts down Stegosauruses, Apatosauruses and even Woolly Mammoths. He possesses enormous power and endurance for his or any size, his feats of strength including supporting his own weight with his jaws, to being able to lift a fully grown sauropod (Brontosaurus, Brachiosaurus and Diplodocus). His scaly hide is almost impenetrable, being able to shrug off the bites of larger predators.

Gon's intelligence seems to fluctuate in each adventure, ranging from total cluelessness (such as failing to notice a bird nest on his head for weeks), to strategic cunning (using an Allosaurus as a beast of burden to capture prey).

In Tekken 3, Gon is fireproof, has the ability to spit fireballs and use toxic farts. He vocalizes in chirps and shrieks, reminiscent of raccoons and parrots.

Media

Manga 
Masashi Tanaka (Gon's creator) has said: "This work contains no dialog or onomatopoetic words. People always ask me why I have done this. From the beginning, I didn't think it was necessary. Manga should be without grammar. I also think that it is strange to give animals human language and make them talk. What I set out to do with Gon was to draw something that was more interesting than anything you could say in words. Manga still has great potential that does not exist in other media. I plan to continue developing the art of expression".

Gon's adventures are usually comedic with environmental connotations. There is very little continuity within the series, with Gon appearing in different countries and interacting with their respective fauna in almost every issue. He is often portrayed as being a short-tempered yet good-hearted creature, offering his help to the various animal friends he encounters in each issue.

The first English editions of the manga were published by Mandarin Publishing (UK, 1994) and Paradox Press (USA, 1996–2000). The single Mandarin volume contains the eight stories that were in the first two Japanese Gon collections. The eight Paradox Press volumes contain all the published Gon stories: six eight-page full-color stories in the Gon Color Spectacular, and twenty-one black-and-white stories, of varying length, in the other seven volumes.

Mandarin Publishing
Gon: 

Paradox Press
Gon (1996): 
Gon Again! (1996): 
Here Today, Gon Tomorrow! (1996): 
Going, Going...Gon (1996): 
Gon Swimmin′  (1997): 
Gon Color Spectacular! (1998): 
Gon Underground (1999): 
Gon on Safari (2000): 
The first two Paradox Press books (Gon and Gon Again) were later reissued in an omnibus volume:
Gon: Introducing the Dinosaur That Time Will Never Forget! (2001): 
The third and fourth Paradox Press books (Here Today, Gon Tomorrow and Going, Going...Gon) were also reissued in an omnibus volume:
Gon Wild! (1998): 

From 2007 to 2009 CMX, a subset of DC Comics, reissued the black-and-white Gon stories in a seven-volume series. These did not have volume titles, but were simply numbered. Unlike the Paradox Press versions which were reversed for western readers, these stories are printed in the original sequence, and in their original right-to-left format. CMX had closed their doors in early 2010. Kodansha Comics reprinted the seven-volume series in 2011 and 2012.

Video games 

Gon made his first video game appearance in the SNES platform game of the same name. The game was developed by Tose and released in Japan by Bandai on November 11, 1994. A new platformer, Gon: Baku Baku Baku Baku Adventure, developed for the Nintendo 3DS and was released in Japan on June 14, 2012 and later released in South Korea by Namco Bandai Games.

Gon is a licensed guest character appearing in Tekken 3, originally released for PlayStation consoles in April 1998, following the game's arcade debut on March 20, 1997. He is unlockable by defeating him in the Tekken Ball mode or by achieving a high score in Survival mode and inputting the name "Gon".

Theatrical movie release 
Sprite Animation Studios announced that Moto Sakakibara, co-director of Final Fantasy: The Spirits Within, will direct a theatrical CG Animation based on the Gon manga. The movie was due for release in 2009 but has yet to materialize.

Anime 
A CG animated television series co-produced by Kodansha and Korean publisher Daewon Media aired in Japan from April 2, 2012 to March 25, 2013. It featured Motoko Kumai as the voice of Gon.

Reception
Gon won an Excellence Award in the Manga division at the second Japan Media Arts Festival in 1998. It won the Eisner Award for Best U.S. Edition of Foreign Material and Best Humor Publication at the Eisner Awards in 1998.

See also
 Age of Reptiles (comics) − another silent comic featuring dinosaurs

References

External links
Sprite Animation Studios Press Release

 
1991 manga
2012 anime television series debuts
Dinosaurs in anime and manga
Comics about animals
Kodansha manga
Manga series
Paradox Press titles
Seinen manga
TV Tokyo original programming
Comics set in prehistory
Pantomime comics